Reece Ushijima (born 13 January 2003) is a Japanese-American racing driver who is currently racing in the 2023 USF Pro 2000 Championship with Jay Howard Driver Development. He previously competed in the 2022 FIA Formula 3 Championship for Van Amersfoort Racing.

Career

Karting 
Ushijima made his international competitive karting debut in 2017 in the SKUSA SuperNationals for Phil Giebler Racing, competing against the likes of Jak Crawford and Zane Maloney.  He then raced in X30 Senior category in IAME Asia, IAME Euroseries, Benelux, Asian Karting Championship, and Super One and British Karting Championships in the UK, racing for Piers Sexton Racing.  In 2019, he finished 2nd in the Asian Karting Championship and 3rd in IAME Asia Final.

Formula Ford 
In November 2019, at the age of 16, Ushijima transitioned from karts to cars. On the weekend following his racing licence acquisition he qualified on pole position, finishing P3 and P2 in the races and taking fastest lap at the BRSCC Formula Ford Winter Series in Wales, UK.

MRF Challenge Formula 2000 
In the 2019–20 MRF Challenge Formula 2000 Championship held during the winter in Dubai, Sakhir and Chennai, Ushijima logged two fastest laps and finished 7th in the standings. His best finish was 4th place at the final round in Madras Motor Race Track, Chennai.

BRDC Formula 3 Championship

2020 
For the 2020 season Ushijima signed with Hitech Grand Prix to race in the BRDC British Formula 3 Championship. The American started off strongly, scoring his maiden podium in the second round, with second at Donington Park. His next podium came at the next round, held at Brands Hatch, however this would be the final podium of his season. Ushijima finished eleventh in the standings, nine places behind teammate Kush Maini.

2021 

For the 2021 season, Ushijima remained with Hitech, this time alongside Sebastián Álvarez and Bart Horsten. His first podium came at the opening round of the season, with third in race two at Brands Hatch. In the second round at Silverstone Circuit, Ushijima earned double pole, his first pole position in the series, followed up by his maiden wins in races 1 and 2. He would go on to score three more podiums and a further pole on his way to 4th in the final standings.

F3 Asian Championship 
In the winter of 2021 Ushijima competed in the F3 Asian Championship with Hitech GP. He scored 45 points, and with a best race finish of fifth, ended up twelfth in the championship.

FIA Formula 3 Championship 

Ushijima partook in post-season testing with Van Amersfoort Racing and was confirmed to drive for the team during the 2022 season, partnering Franco Colapinto and Rafael Villagómez.

At the end of the season, Ushijima partook in the post-season test with Hitech Grand Prix.

USF Pro 2000 Championship 
For his 2023 campaign, Ushijima left Formula 3 and signed to compete in the USF Pro 2000 Championship with Jay Howard Driver Development.

Personal life 
Ushijima's mother is American; his father, who grew up in the United States, is Japanese. Though Ushijima was born in California, he moved to Japan at a young age and began his karting career there.

Karting record

Karting career summary

Racing record

Racing career summary

Complete BRDC British F3 Championship results 
(key) (Races in bold indicate pole position) (Races in italics indicate fastest lap)

Complete F3 Asian Championship results 
(key) (Races in bold indicate pole position) (Races in italics indicate fastest lap)

Complete FIA Formula 3 Championship results 
(key) (Races in bold indicate pole position; races in italics indicate points for the fastest lap of top ten finishers)

American open-wheel racing results

USF Pro 2000 Championship 
(key) (Races in bold indicate pole position) (Races in italics indicate fastest lap) (Races with * indicate most race laps led)

References

External links 

 
Driver Website

2003 births
Living people
American racing drivers
Japanese racing drivers
American people of Japanese descent
BRDC British Formula 3 Championship drivers
F3 Asian Championship drivers
FIA Formula 3 Championship drivers
Van Amersfoort Racing drivers
Hitech Grand Prix drivers
MRF Challenge Formula 2000 Championship drivers